John Stephen Hunt (born November 6, 1962) is a former professional American football guard in the National Football League for the Dallas Cowboys and Tampa Bay Buccaneers. He played college football at the  University of Florida.

Early years
Hunt attended Edgewater High School, where he played football and baseball. He accepted a football scholarship from the University of Florida.

He became a regular starter at left guard as a junior. Even though he broke a hand on October 8, 1983, against Vanderbilt University, he started the final 22 games of his college career. As a senior, he was considered a key player in the team's improved running game.

Professional career

Dallas Cowboys
Hunt was selected by the Dallas Cowboys in the ninth round (232nd overall) of the 1984 NFL Draft. On September 28, he was placed on the injured reserve list with a back injury. He returned to the roster in week eight, but wasn't active until the twelfth game, replacing an injured Howard Richards.

In the Thanksgiving game against the New England Patriots, he was forced to play at right guard when starter Kurt Petersen injured an ankle in the first half. He performed well the rest of the contest and started the next week against the Philadelphia Eagles. He was released on August 27, 1985.

Tampa Bay Buccaneers
After the players went on a strike on the third week of the 1987 season, those games were canceled (reducing the 16 game season to 15) and the NFL decided that the games would be played with replacement players. Hunt was signed to be a part of the Tampa Bay Buccaneers replacement team. He was a backup player, before being released at the end of the strike.

Coaching career
Hunt coached high school football from 1992 to 1998. In 1999, he was named the offensive line coach for the University of Florida. In 2002, he was named the offensive line coach for the Washington Redskins. In 2004, he was named the offensive line coach for the University of South Carolina and remained there until 2008.

Hunt is currently the head football coach and a Personal Fitness teacher at Woodward Academy. He was named the AAAA Georgia Football Coach of the Year for 2014, when for the first time since 1997, Woodward advanced to the state championship semifinals after capturing the region championship.

References

External links
John Hunt Named Assistant Football Coach At South Carolina

1962 births
Living people
Players of American football from Orlando, Florida
American football offensive tackles
Dallas Cowboys players
Tampa Bay Buccaneers players
Florida Gators football players
Florida Gators football coaches
Washington Redskins coaches
South Carolina Gamecocks football coaches
National Football League replacement players